Thomas Öberg may refer to:
 Thomas Öberg (singer) (born 1967), Swedish singer
 Thomas Öberg (figure skater) (born 1958), Swedish figure skater